Leucanopsis turrialba is a moth in the family Erebidae. It was described by William Schaus in 1911. It is found in Costa Rica and Guatemala.

References

turrialba
Moths described in 1911